Joshua Stein (born September 13, 1966) is an American lawyer and politician who has served as the 50th Attorney General of North Carolina since 2017. A member of the Democratic Party, Stein previously served as a member of the North Carolina Senate representing District 16, located in Wake County.

While a member of the North Carolina Senate, Stein announced in 2013 that he would run for re-election in 2014 and then for North Carolina Attorney General in 2016. His former boss, Attorney General Roy Cooper, successfully ran for Governor in 2016. Following his win in the Democratic primary, Stein resigned from his seat in the State Senate to focus on the race for Attorney General. Stein won the general election, defeating Republican Buck Newton. He was the first Jew in North Carolina history to win a statewide election. Stein was re-elected in 2020, defeating Republican Jim O'Neill. On January 18, 2023, Stein announced his campaign for Governor of North Carolina in 2024.

Early life 
Josh Stein was born on September 13, 1966, in Washington, D.C.. His family then moved to Charlotte, North Carolina before settling in Chapel Hill. He attended Chapel Hill High School and played on its soccer team. Stein's father, Adam Stein, co-founded North Carolina's first integrated law firm. Stein graduated from Chapel Hill High School and earned his undergraduate degree at Dartmouth College. After college, he taught English and economics in Zimbabwe. Stein then went on to earn degrees from Harvard Law School and the Kennedy School of Government.

Early career 
Stein has worked for the Self-Help Credit Union in Durham and for the United States Senate. In the late 1990s he became an intern for State Representative Dan Blue. North Carolina Attorney General Roy Cooper later appointed him Assistant Attorney General for Consumer Protection. In 1998 he managed John Edwards' U.S. Senate campaign. From 2012 until 2016, he served as Of Counsel at Smith Moore Leatherwood LLP, a regional law firm.

Stein was sworn into office as a member of the North Carolina Senate on January 15, 2009. After being re-elected, he was elected minority whip by his colleagues in December 2010.

North Carolina Attorney General 
As Attorney General, Stein has sought and received additional funding to test North Carolina's backlog of untested sexual assault kits. This has led to new arrests in cases involving a 2015 assault and attempted murder in Durham, North Carolina; assaults in 2009 and 2010 in Fayetteville; and a 1993 assault in Winston-Salem.

Stein is among the four state attorneys general negotiating a national settlement framework with drug companies over the nation's opioid epidemic. He helped finalize a settlement with the opioid manufacturer Mallinckrodt in which the company agreed to pay $1.6 billion for its role in the epidemic.

In 2018, Stein filed a brief with the United States Supreme Court arguing in favor of the Affordable Care Act. In 2019, Stein became the first attorney general in the country to sue e-cigarette manufacturer JUUL for unlawful marketing to minors.

Stein negotiated eight Anti-Robocall Principles with a bipartisan coalition of 51 attorneys general and 12 companies to protect phone users from illegal robocalls. He also launched Operation Silver Shield, an effort to protect older North Carolinians from fraud and scams.

Since the beginning of the COVID-19 pandemic, Stein won a preliminary injunction against a Charlotte tow company sued for price-gouging, and announced the investigation of nine North Carolina-based sellers on Amazon who are accused of raising prices on coronavirus-related products, including hand sanitizer and N-95 masks.

The Legislature voted to remove Stein as their legal representation before the courts on August 21, 2021, after he refused to appeal the findings of a lower court that a North Carolina state law that disenfranchised anyone convicted of a felony was unconstitutional. Stein cited he had been waiting for the ruling to be formally filed. Legislative leaders alleged Stein was "slow-walking" the case in order to allow felons to vote in the next election and used these claims to justify his immediate removal.

2024 gubernatorial campaign 
On January 18, 2023, Stein formally announced his candidacy for the office of governor of North Carolina in the 2024 election.

Personal life 
Josh Stein is married to Anna Harris Stein and has three children.

Electoral history

References

Further reading
 Raleigh News & Observer profile (archived)
 NC General Assembly page (archived)

External links

 North Carolina Department of Justice
 Campaign website
 
 

|-

1966 births
21st-century American lawyers
21st-century American politicians
American expatriates in Zimbabwe
American Jews from North Carolina
Chapel Hill High School (Chapel Hill, North Carolina) alumni
Dartmouth College alumni
Democratic Party North Carolina state senators
Harvard Kennedy School alumni
Harvard Law School alumni
Jewish American attorneys
Jewish American people in North Carolina politics
Living people
North Carolina Attorneys General
North Carolina lawyers
People from Chapel Hill, North Carolina
Politicians from Raleigh, North Carolina